Varsity View is a mostly residential neighbourhood located near central Saskatoon, Saskatchewan, Canada. It is immediately south of the University of Saskatchewan campus. It is an older suburban subdivision, comprising a mixture of low-density, single detached dwellings, detached duplexes and apartment-style units. As of 2007, the area is home to 3,611 residents. The neighbourhood is considered a middle-income area, with an average family income of $50,587, an average dwelling value of $284,710 and a home ownership rate of 38.7%. Its proximity to the university gives this area its relatively high student population,  almost 25% in 2005.

History

Development was spurred by the establishment of the University of Saskatchewan in 1907. The land for the Varsity View neighbourhood was annexed by the city in 1911; it was among the first parcels of land annexed after Saskatoon's incorporation five years earlier. The first homeowner was Richard Bottomley, an English real estate developer who was said to have invested $1.5 million in the real estate boom of 1912. His house, now referred to as Bottomley House, is a large, Queen Anne Revival style home. It was designated a municipal heritage property on April 24, 2006.

In 1911, the school board purchased the block in which the Albert School would be constructed; it opened in 1912 at 610 Clarence Avenue South. It was designed in the Collegiate Gothic style by Scottish architect David Webster, who also designed several similar-looking schools (King George, King Edward, Buena Vista, Westmount, Caswell and Alexandra). Besides serving as an educational centre, Albert School played a big role in city sports, especially lacrosse and hockey. It was also used for other purposes, such as English classes for large numbers of Ukrainians in 1916.

According to a 1913 map, the current neighbourhood encompasses a collection of registered subdivisions were originally named University Annex, Bottomley Addition, Varsity Park and College Park (which would be reused to designate another neighbourhood). College Drive and Elliott Street were not substantially developed until the late 1920s, while neighbouring Osler Street had to wait for residential construction until the early 1950s. The majority of the housing stock was built between 1946 and 1960. The oldest homes are located at the neighbourhood's north and west ends, as development progressed from the university campus and Nutana's eastern edge. Two more schools, Brunskill and Bishop Murray, opened in the 1950s.

After more than seventy years, a drop in enrollments brought the closing of Albert School in 1978, after which it served as the centre for l'Ecole Francaise de Saskatoon. It became the Albert Community Centre in 1982, sparing it from the wrecking ball. It was officially designated a municipal heritage property on October 11, 1983.

Government and politics
Varsity View exists within the federal electoral district of Saskatoon—University. It is currently represented by Brad Trost of the Conservative Party of Canada, first elected in 2004 and re-elected in 2006, 2008, 2011 and 2015.

Provincially, the area is divided by 13th Street and Wiggins Avenue into the constituencies of Saskatoon Nutana and Saskatoon University. Saskatoon Nutana is currently represented by Cathy Sproule of the Saskatchewan New Democratic Party since 2011. Saskatoon University is currently represented by Eric Olauson of the Saskatchewan Party since 2016.

In Saskatoon's non-partisan municipal politics, Varsity View lies within ward 6. It is currently represented by Councillor Cynthia Block, first elected in 2016.

Institutions

Education

Bishop Murray High School - separate (Catholic) secondary, part of Greater Saskatoon Catholic Schools. The school was originally an elementary school when it opened in 1954, but was converted in 1995 to a high school with alternative programs.
Brunskill School - public elementary, part of the Saskatoon Public School Division. The school was built at a cost of $247,430 and opened in 1951. It was named after William 'Cy' Brunskill, a longtime member of the school board. It was the first single-storey school in Saskatoon with a specially designed kindergarten room and main floor playrooms. It was also the first school where the principal was not assigned a particular grade to teach. Brunskill School was the first Saskatoon elementary school to have a centralized library. The school was closed for the 1999-2000 school year while almost the entire building was demolished and then rebuilt. Classes resumed at the "renovated" school in the fall of 2000.

Other
 University of Saskatchewan - Varsity View is the closest residential neighbourhood to the U of S core campus, located across College Drive, with additional facilities on the eastern periphery of the community across Cumberland Avenue.
 Albert Community Centre - formerly Albert School, now a multipurpose facility for community events
 Kinsmen Children's Centre - facility opened in 1985 and attached to Brunskill School, housing several agencies to help children with special needs
 Luthercare Communities - assisted living and care facility for senior citizens

Parks and recreation

Raoul Wallenberg Park (2.6 acres)
Cumberland Park (3.3 acres)
Albert Park (3.4 acres)
President Murray Park (7.3 acres)

The planting of 1500 spruce trees in President Murray Park was done under the supervision of Wyndham Winkler Ashley, a charter member of the Saskatoon Parks Board in 1912. W.W. Ashley Park in the Haultain neighbourhood was named in his honour.

The Varsity View Community Association organizes events, delivers recreational and leisure programs, coordinates sports programs for children/youth and maintains the outdoor rink at Brunskill School.

Commercial
Commercial development is limited; some businesses are located at the southern edge of the neighbourhood, within the 8th Street business district. There are also a few businesses clustered near College Drive and Cumberland Avenue, bordering the University of Saskatchewan campus. A couple of businesses also exist adjacent to Brunskill School on Temperance Street and Wiggans Avenue. 43 home-based businesses exist in the neighbourhood. Closest major commercial developments are the Central Business District (aka Downtown), and the 8th Street and Broadway Avenue business strips.

Location
Varsity View is located within the Core Neighbourhoods Suburban Development Area. It is bounded by College Drive to the north, 8th Street to the south, Cumberland Avenue to the east, and Clarence Avenue to the west. Roads are laid out in a grid fashion; streets run east-west, avenues run north-south. The University Bridge connects the north end of the neighbourhood to the west side of Saskatoon.

References

External links
Varsity View neighbourhood profile - 2006
City of Saskatoon · Departments · Community Services · City Planning · ZAM Maps
Populace Spring 2006
Varsity View Community Association

Neighbourhoods in Saskatoon